is a Japanese method of dyeing fabrics using a resist paste applied through a stencil, typically a rice flour mixture applied with a brush or a tool such as a palette knife. Unlike , stencils are used repeatedly to make a repeating pattern. Pigment is added by hand-painting, immersion dyeing, or both. The area of the fabric covered and permeated by the paste mixture resists the later application of dye, thus creating undyed areas within the fabric.

 was first invented as an inexpensive and faster alternative to highly-patterned woven brocade fabrics. Over time,  evolved into a respected fibre art form of its own.

Thin fabrics dyed in the  style show the fabric's design on the back of the fabric, whereas thicker or more tightly-woven fabrics generally have a solid colour underside, typically indigo blue for cotton fabrics. Futon covers made from multiple panels of  fabric, if the stencils are properly placed and the panels joined correctly, can display a seamless stencilled pattern. Besides cotton,  has been used to decorate linen, silk and fabrics that are entirely or partially-synthetic.

See also
 
 
 Serizawa Keisuke
 Mika Toba

External links

 What is Katazome?
 Paste Resist Recipe
 About Katazome
 Katazome (stencil dyeing)

Japanese words and phrases
Japanese dyeing techniques
Japanese inventions